Wheelock is a ghost town in Wheelock Township, Williams County, in the northwestern part of the U.S. state of North Dakota. In 1938, the Federal Writers' Project found a population of 115 in Wheelock. In the 1990 census, the population was 23. All census population figures after 1990 are estimates. The town was disincorporated in 1994, and now is reverting to the elements.

History 
Wheelock was founded in 1902 along the transcontinental rail line of the Great Northern Railway. The name comes from Ralph W. Wheelock, an editorial writer with the Minneapolis Tribune who wrote favorably about the site.

Unlike some ghost towns, Wheelock's homes, churches, and commercial buildings have the look of just recently being occupied. The paint is peeling, but it is still there. The grass is green, although it is not mowed. The roof of the two-story brick schoolhouse has caved in, carrying with it the back wall and exposing the four classrooms and the gymnasium roof girder. The town garage stands empty. A handful of commercial buildings and the church appear almost  as if they could be occupied—but are unoccupied and deteriorating. The railroad track, now owned by BNSF Railway, still runs through town. Wheelock remains the location of a passing siding. The grain elevator was razed in 2011/2012. The general store burned down in 2005. The school was razed in 2012/2013 for an unknown reason.

In January 2018, the former church was listed up for sale, with an asking price of $75,000. As of January 2019, it had not yet sold and was listed for $65,000.

Due to the North Dakota oil boom, the town has seen considerable growth since 2010, although there are still no businesses in operation.

Climate
According to the Köppen Climate Classification system, Wheelock has a semi-arid climate, abbreviated "BSk" on climate maps.

References

External links
 Photos of Wheelock in June 2006

Former municipalities in North Dakota
Ghost towns in North Dakota
Populated places disestablished in 1994
Populated places in Williams County, North Dakota